Rabupura is a town and a nagar panchayat in Gautam Buddha Nagar district in the Indian state of Uttar Pradesh.

Geography
It has an average elevation of 196 metres (643 feet).

Demographics
 India census, Rabupura had a population of 13,024. Males constitute 53% of the population and females 47%. Rabupura has an average literacy rate of 43%, lower than the national average of 59.5%: male literacy is 54%, and female literacy is 30%. In Rabupura, 19% of the population is under 6 years of age.

References

Cities and towns in Gautam Buddh Nagar district

Memoir of Zila Bulandshahr author Raja Lachchman Singh